WXZR-LP was a Variety formatted broadcast radio station. The station was licensed to and served Rocky Mount in Virginia. WXZR-LP was owned and operated by Franklin County Local Radio.

Franklin County Local Radio surrendered WXZR-LP's license to the Federal Communications Commission on December 19, 2022, and it was cancelled on December 27, 2022.

References

External links
 

2017 establishments in Virginia
Radio stations established in 2017
Variety radio stations in the United States
XZR-LP
XZR-LP
Defunct radio stations in the United States
Radio stations disestablished in 2022
2022 disestablishments in Virginia